Pier 4 station is a proposed Manila Light Rail Transit (LRT) station situated on Line 2 which will serve as the new western terminus of the line. The extension line will begin at Recto station and will end at the Manila North Harbor in Tondo. The west extension project calls for the construction of three additional elevated stations, two on Recto Avenue and one on Mel Lopez Boulevard near Pier 4 of the Manila North Harbor. It was approved by the National Economic and Development Authority on May 19, 2015.

The station would be the third and last for trains headed west from Recto and the fifteenth or last for trains headed from Antipolo. The station will rise on Mel Lopez Boulevard and it will be located 50 meters north of Zaragoza Street, right in front of the Manila North Port Passenger Terminal Complex in Pier 4.

Currently, the station is in the planning stages.

Nearby landmarks
When completed, the station will be close to the North Port Passenger Terminal of the Manila North Harbor complex, 2GO Travel headquarters, Philippine Coast Guard Parola Base, Rosauro Almario Elementary School, Roxas Bridge (formerly Del Pan) and San Nicolas district.

See also
Manila Light Rail Transit System Line 2

References

Manila Light Rail Transit System stations
Proposed railway stations in the Philippines